T-Dog may refer to:

Tionette Stoddard, aka T-Dog, New Zealand skeleton racer
"T Dog", an alias of Anthony Weiner
T-Dog (The Walking Dead), fictional character in The Walking Dead
T-Dog, fictional character played by Max Kasch in the film Waiting...